was a town located in Motosu District, Gifu Prefecture, Japan.

On, February 1, 2004, Motosu absorbed the towns of Itonuki, Neo and Shinsei (all from Motosu District) to create the city of Motosu.

Notes

External links
 Motosu official website 

Dissolved municipalities of Gifu Prefecture